PP-47 Narowal-II is a Constituency of Provincial Assembly of Punjab.

General elections 2018

See also 
 PP-46 Narowal-I
 PP-48 Narowal-III

References

External links 

 Election commission Pakistan's official website
 Awazoday.com check result
 Official Website of Government of Punjab

Constituencies of Punjab, Pakistan